James Alfred 'Bill' Cox OBE (18 March 1910 – 3 December 1985) was an English professional golfer. In golfing publications his full name was given as William James Cox. He was in the British Ryder Cup teams in 1935 and 1937 and tied for 8th place in the 1938 Open Championship. After World War II he became a commentator on BBC Television.

Golf career
Cox played on the British Ryder Cup teams in 1935 and 1937. He was tied for the lead after two rounds in the 1936 Open Championship but a third-round 79 dropped him down the field and he finished tied for 12th place. In the 1938 Open he finished tied for 8th place, his best finish. In 1939 he finished tied for second place in the News Chronicle Tournament.

In 1946 he became the professional Fulwell Golf Club where he remained until 1975.

He was awarded the OBE in the 1967 Birthday Honours "for services to golf".

Broadcasting career
After World War II Cox was a frequent broadcaster on BBC Television, generally as a commentator with Henry Longhurst. He was replaced by Peter Alliss in 1969.

Professional wins
1951 Daily Telegraph Foursomes Tournament (with Walter McLeod)

Results in major championships

Note: Cox only played in The Open Championship.

NT = No tournament
CUT = missed the half-way cut
"T" indicates a tie for a place

Team appearances
Ryder Cup (representing Great Britain): 1935, 1937
England–Scotland Professional Match (representing England): 1935 (winners), 1936 (winners), 1937 (winners)
Coronation Match (representing the Ladies and Professionals): 1937

References

English male golfers
Ryder Cup competitors for Europe
Golf writers and broadcasters
British sports broadcasters
BBC sports presenters and reporters
Officers of the Order of the British Empire
People from Chalfont St Giles
1910 births
1985 deaths
People from Copthorne, West Sussex